Rivetina elegans is a type of species of praying mantis in the family Rivetinidae.

See also
List of mantis genera and species

References

elegans
Insects described in 1967